is a private university in Kashiwara, Osaka, Japan, established in 1997.

External links
 Official website

Educational institutions established in 1997
Private universities and colleges in Japan
Universities and colleges in Osaka Prefecture

Kashiwara, Osaka
1997 establishments in Japan